Mario Padilla (born July 12, 1985) is a Mexican professional footballer who plays for Oaxaca of Ascenso MX on loan from Sinaloa.

External links
Ascenso MX 

Liga MX players
Living people
Mexican footballers
1985 births
Association football forwards
Place of birth missing (living people)